Sinothomisus is a genus of spiders in the family Thomisidae. It was first described in 2006 by Tang, Yin, Griswold & Peng. , it contains 2 Chinese species.

References

Thomisidae
Araneomorphae genera
Spiders of China